Kate Atkinson may refer to:

 Kate Atkinson (actress) (born 1972), Australian actress
 Kate Atkinson (writer) (born 1951), English writer